

Commentators (as of 2023)

Play-by-play
Joe Davis
Adam Amin
Jason Benetti
Kenny Albert
Brandon Gaudin
Alex Faust
Kevin Kugler
Cory Provus
Jeff Levering

Color commentators
John Smoltz
A. J. Pierzynski
Eric Karros 
Tom Verducci
Mark Sweeney
Dontrelle Willis

Field reporters
Ken Rosenthal
Tom Verducci
Tom Rinaldi

Studio hosts
Kevin Burkhardt
Chris Myers (fill-in)
Mike Hill (fill-in)
Rob Stone  (fill-in)
Tom Rinaldi (fill-in)
Noah Eagle (fill-in)
Rob Parker (postseason fill-in)

Studio analysts
Frank Thomas
David Ortiz
Alex Rodriguez
Dontrelle Willis
Eric Karros
A. J. Pierzynski
Derek Jeter
Nick Swisher
Terry Collins
Mark Sweeney

Pairings history

1990s

1996–1997
Joe Buck/Tim McCarver/Bob Brenly
Thom Brennaman/Bob Brenly
John Rooney/Jeff Torborg
Josh Lewin/Ken Singleton

1998
 Joe Buck/Tim McCarver/Bob Brenly
 Thom Brennaman/Bob Brenly
John Rooney/Jeff Torborg
Josh Lewin/Frank Robinson

1999
 Joe Buck/Tim McCarver/Bob Brenly
 Thom Brennaman/Bob Brenly
Chip Caray/Jeff Torborg
Josh Lewin/Frank Robinson or Kevin Kennedy

2000s

2000
 Joe Buck/Tim McCarver/Bob Brenly
 Thom Brennaman/Bob Brenly
Josh Lewin/Kevin Kennedy
Chip Caray/Jeff Torborg

2001–2005
 Joe Buck/Tim McCarver/Ken Rosenthal (2005)
 Thom Brennaman/Steve Lyons
 Josh Lewin/Regional Weekly Hire
Kenny Albert/Regional Weekly Hire

2006
 Joe Buck/Tim McCarver/Ken Rosenthal
 Thom Brennaman/Steve Lyons
 Josh Lewin/Lou Piniella
 Kenny Albert/Regional Weekly Hire

2007
1. Joe Buck/Tim McCarver/Ken Rosenthal
2. Thom Brennaman/Joe Girardi
3. Josh Lewin/Eric Karros, Kenny Albert or Matt Vasgersian/Mark Grace

2008
1. Joe Buck, Tom McCarthy, Kenny Albert, Dick Stockton, Howie Rose, or Josh Lewin/Tim McCarver/Ken Rosenthal
2. Thom Brennaman/Mark Grace
3. Kenny Albert/Eric Karros

Matt Vasgersian was a regular announcer. Dick Stockton and Josh Lewin were also regular fill-in announcers. Leo Mazzone was a fill-in color commentator.

2009
1. Joe Buck or Josh Lewin/Tim McCarver or Eric Karros/Ken Rosenthal
2. Thom Brennaman/Mark Grace
3. Kenny Albert/Eric Karros

Dick Stockton and Josh Lewin were also regular fill-in announcers.

2010s

2010
 Joe Buck/Tim McCarver/Ken Rosenthal (All-Star Game, NLCS, World Series)
 Thom Brennaman/Mark Grace (regular season only)
 Kenny Albert/Eric Karros

Josh Lewin filled-in during the NHL and NBA playoffs and NFL season.

2011
 Joe Buck/Tim McCarver/Ken Rosenthal
 Thom Brennaman/Eric Karros (regular season only)
 Kenny Albert/Mark Grace

Matt Vasgersian, Dick Stockton, and Josh Lewin were also regular fill-in announcers.

2012–2013
 Joe Buck/Tim McCarver
 Thom Brennaman/Eric Karros or Tom Verducci
 Kenny Albert/Regional Weekly Hire
 Dick Stockton/Regional Weekly Hire (night game weeks only)

Dave Sims and Eric Karros called Philip Humber's perfect game on April 21, 2012.

2014
Joe Buck or Kenny Albert/Harold Reynolds and Tom Verducci/Ken Rosenthal and Erin Andrews  
Thom Brennaman/Eric Karros (April–August) or Matt Vasgersian/John Smoltz/Jon Paul Morosi (September-postseason)  
Justin Kutcher/Regional Weekly Hire
Kenny Albert/Regional Weekly Hire

2015
 Joe Buck, Kenny Albert, or Aaron Goldsmith/Harold Reynolds and Tom Verducci/Ken Rosenthal
 Matt Vasgersian/John Smoltz/Jon Paul Morosi
 Kenny Albert/Eric Karros
 Joe Davis/Regional Weekly Hire
 Justin Kutcher/Regional Weekly Hire

A. J. Pierzynski joined Vasgersian/Smoltz/Morosi for the 2015 ALDS.

2016
 Joe Buck or Matt Vasgersian/John Smoltz/Ken Rosenthal
 Kenny Albert/Harold Reynolds/Tom Verducci/Jon Paul Morosi
 Matt Vasgersian/Eric Karros
 Joe Davis/Regional Weekly Hire
 Justin Kutcher/Regional Weekly Hire
 Aaron Goldsmith/Regional Weekly Hire

2017
 Joe Buck or Matt Vasgersian/John Smoltz/Ken Rosenthal and Tom Verducci
 Kenny Albert or Joe Davis/A. J. Pierzynski/Jon Paul Morosi
 Matt Vasgersian or Justin Kutcher/Eric Karros
 Joe Davis/Regional Weekly Hire
 Justin Kutcher/Regional Weekly Hire
 Aaron Goldsmith/Regional Weekly Hire

David Cone, who served as a color commentator on select games for the New York Yankees on the YES Network, joined Davis/Pierzynski/Morosi for the 2017 ALDS.

2018
 Joe Buck (NLCS, World Series, All-Star Game, select regular season games) or Joe Davis (Division Series, most regular season games)/John Smoltz/Ken Rosenthal and Tom Verducci
 Kenny Albert, Kevin Burkhardt or Don Orsillo/A. J. Pierzynski/David Cone/Jon Paul Morosi
 Justin Kutcher/Eric Karros or C. J. Nitkowski
 Joe Davis/Regional Weekly Hire
 Aaron Goldsmith/Regional Weekly Hire

2019
 Joe Buck (ALCS, World Series, All-Star Game, select regular season games) or Joe Davis (Division Series, most regular season games) /John Smoltz/Ken Rosenthal and Tom Verducci
 Kenny Albert or Len Kasper/A. J. Pierzynski and/or Joe Girardi/Jon Paul Morosi
 Justin Kutcher or Jeff Levering or Eric Collins/Eric Karros and/or C. J. Nitkowski, or John Farrell
 Len Kasper or Don Orsillo/Regional Weekly Hire
 Aaron Goldsmith/Regional Weekly Hire

Joe Davis filled-in for Buck during Game 4 of the ALCS while Buck called Thursday Night Football.

2020s

2020
 Joe Buck (select regular season games, NLCS, World Series) or Joe Davis (NLDS, most regular season games, NLCS Game 7) or Kevin Burkhardt (select regular season games)/John Smoltz/Ken Rosenthal and Tom Verducci
 Kevin Burkhardt or Adam Amin (NLDS)/A. J. Pierzynski and Adam Wainwright (NLDS)/Tom Verducci (NLDS)
 Don Orsillo or Adam Amin or Aaron Goldsmith or Kevin Burkhardt/Eric Karros/Jon Paul Morosi

Joe Davis called Game 7 of the NLCS for Joe Buck, who was in Tampa Bay, working the Packers-Buccaneers game on the same day.

2021
 Joe Buck, Aaron Goldsmith, or Joe Davis/John Smoltz/Ken Rosenthal
 Adam Amin or Kevin Burkhardt/Eric Karros/Tom Verducci
 Kevin Burkhardt, Joe Davis, Aaron Goldsmith, Adam Amin, Len Kasper, Alex Faust, Kevin Kugler, or Brandon Gaudin/A. J. Pierzynski or Mark Sweeney or Hunter Pence

2022
 Joe Davis or Aaron Goldsmith or Adam Amin/John Smoltz/Ken Rosenthal
 Adam Amin or Kenny Albert or Don Orsillo/A. J. Pierzynski or Eric Karros/Tom Verducci
 Aaron Goldsmith, Len Kasper, Alex Faust, or Brandon Gaudin/Mark Sweeney

Studio
Chip Caray/Dave Winfield/Steve Lyons (1996)
Chip Caray/Steve Lyons (1997–1998)
Keith Olbermann/Steve Lyons (1999–2000)
Jeanne Zelasko/Kevin Kennedy (2001–2008)
Jeanne Zelasko/Kevin Kennedy/Eric Karros (2007–2008), Mark Grace (2007–2008), or Joe Girardi (2007)
 Chris Rose (2009–2011) (on-site)
 Chris Rose/Kevin Millar (2010 primetime games)
 Chris Rose/Mitch Williams (2011 primetime games)
Matt Vasgersian or Greg Amsinger/Harold Reynolds/Kevin Millar (2012–2013) (Primary hosts in MLB Network studios)
Kevin Burkhardt or Rob Stone or Ryan Field or Chris Myers/Frank Thomas/Gabe Kapler/C. J. Nitkowski (2014)
Kevin Burkhardt or Rob Stone or Ryan Field or Chris Myers/Frank Thomas/Raul Ibanez/Dontrelle Willis/Mark Sweeney/C. J. Nitkowski/Pete Rose (2015)
Kevin Burkhardt or Chris Myers/Frank Thomas/Eric Karros/Pete Rose/C. J. Nitkowski/Dontrelle Willis (2016)
Kevin Burkhardt or Chris Myers or Mike Hill/Frank Thomas/Alex Rodriguez/Eric Karros/Dontrelle Willis/Nick Swisher/A. J. Pierzynski/Mark Sweeney (2017)
Kevin Burkhardt or Chris Myers or Mike Hill/Frank Thomas/Alex Rodriguez/David Ortiz/Eric Karros/Dontrelle Willis/Nick Swisher/A. J. Pierzynski/Mark Sweeney (2018–present)

Commentators

Current

Play-by-play
Kenny Albert (play-by-play, 2001-2019; fill-in play-by-play, since 2022)
Adam Amin (#2 play-by-play, since 2020)
Jason Benetti (play-by-play, 2023-present)
Kevin Burkhardt (studio host, since 2014), (fill-in play-by-play, since 2015)
Joe Davis (lead play-by-play, since 2022), (play-by-play, since 2015), (fill-in lead play-by-play, 2018-2021)

Game analysts
Eric Karros (game analyst, since 2007)
C. J. Nitkowski (game analyst, since 2014), (studio analyst 2014-2016)
A. J. Pierzynski (#2 game analyst, since 2017), (postseason game analyst, 2015), (postseason studio analyst, 2011-2013)
John Smoltz (lead game analyst, since 2016), (#2 analyst 2014-2015)
Tom Verducci (postseason field reporter (LCS and World Series) since 2016), (co-lead analyst 2014–2015), (#2 analyst, 2016)

Field reporters
Jon Morosi (#2 field reporter, since 2014)
Ken Rosenthal (lead field reporter, since 2005)
Tom Verducci (postseason field reporter (LCS and World Series) since 2016), (co-lead analyst 2014–2015), (#2 analyst 2016)
 Tom Rinaldi (Since 2021)

Studio hosts and analysts
Kevin Burkhardt (studio host, since 2014), (fill in play-by-play, since 2015)
Chris Myers (postseason field reporter, 2004–2012), (play-by-play, 2012–2013), (fill-in studio host, 2014–present) 
Matt Vasgersian (fill-in postseason studio host 2022-present, fill-in lead play–by–play 2016–2017, #2 play–by–play 2014-2015, play–by–play 2006–2008, studio host 2012–2013)
Derek Jeter (studio analyst, since 2023)
David Ortiz (postseason studio analyst, since 2017)
Alex Rodriguez (studio analyst, since 2017), (postseason studio analyst, 2015-present) 
Nick Swisher (studio analyst, since 2017)
Frank Thomas (studio analyst, since 2014)
Dontrelle Willis (studio analyst, since 2015)

Former

Play-by-play
Thom Brennaman (#2 play–by–play 1996–2014)
Joe Buck (lead play-by-play, 1996–2021)
Chip Caray (studio host, 1996–1998), (play-by-play, 1999–2000) 
Mike Joy (fill-in play-by-play, 2008)
Justin Kutcher (play-by-play, 2013–2019)
Josh Lewin (play-by-play, 1996–2011)
John Rooney (play-by-play, 1996–1998)
Aaron Goldsmith (play-by-play, 2015-2022)

Game analysts
Bob Brenly (#2 game analyst, 1996–2000), (playoff game analyst, 2004–2005)
Joe Girardi (#2 game analyst, 2007), (fill in studio analyst, 2007)
Kevin Kennedy (game analyst, 1999-2000), (studio analyst, 2001–2008)
Steve Lyons (studio analyst 1996–2000), (#2 game analyst, 2001–2006)
Tim McCarver (lead game analyst, 1996–2013)
Leo Mazzone (game analyst, 2008)
Jose Mota (#2 game analyst for 2006 ALCS Game 4-Until series conclusion) 
Lou Piniella (game analyst, 2006)
Harold Reynolds (co-lead analyst 2014–2015), (#2 game analyst 2016)
Frank Robinson (game analyst, 1998–1999)
Ken Singleton (game analyst, 1996-1997)
Jeff Torborg (game analyst, 1996–2000)

Studio hosts
Chip Caray (studio host, 1996–1998), (play-by-play, 1999–2000)
Keith Olbermann (studio host, 1999–2000)
Chris Rose (studio host, 2009–2011)
Matt Vasgersian (fill in lead play–by–play 2016–2017, #2 play–by–play 2014-2015, play–by–play 2006–2008, studio host 2012–2013) 
Jeanne Zelasko (studio host, 2001–2008) (later on Judge Joe Brown)

Studio analysts
Mark Grace (studio analyst 2007–2008), (#2 game analyst, 2009–2011) 
Gabe Kapler (studio analyst, 2014)
Kevin Kennedy (game analyst, 1999-2000), (studio analyst, 2001–2008)
Steve Lyons (studio analyst 1996–2000), (#2 game analyst, 2001–2006)
Pete Rose (studio analyst, 2015–2016)
Dave Winfield (studio analyst, 1996)

Field reporters
Erin Andrews (postseason field reporter, 2012–2015)

Current and former fill-in broadcasters

Play-by-play
Dick Bremer (fill-in play-by-play)
Matt Devlin (fill-in play-by-play)
Scott Graham (fill-in play-by-play)
Mario Impemba (fill-in play-by-play)
Duane Kuiper (fill-in play-by-play)
Glen Kuiper (fill-in play-by-play)
Tom McCarthy (fill-in play-by-play)
Dan McLaughlin (fill-in play-by-play)
Chris Myers (fill-in play-by-play)
Mel Proctor (fill-in play-by-play, 2002–2004)
Wayne Randazzo (fill-in play-by-play)
Daron Sutton (fill-in play-by-play)

Game analysts
Rod Allen (fill-in game analyst)
Larry Andersen (fill-in game analyst)
Bert Blyleven (fill-in game analyst)
George Brett (fill-in game analyst)
Sean Casey (fill-in game analyst)
Jim Deshaies (fill-in game analyst)
Ray Fosse (fill-in game analyst)
Mark Grant (fill-in game analyst)
Al Hrabosky (fill-in game analyst)
Rex Hudler (fill-in game analyst)
Darrin Jackson (fill-in game analyst)
Jim Kaat (fill-in game analyst)
John Kruk (fill-in game analyst)
Al Leiter (playoff game analyst, 2003–2004) 
Joe Magrane (fill in game analyst)
Rick Manning (fill-in game analyst)
Kevin Millar (fill-in game analyst, primetime game studio analyst)
José Mota (fill-in game analyst)
Jim Palmer (fill in game analyst)
Kevin Kennedy (fill-in game analyst) (former studio analyst)
Mike Krukow (fill-in game analyst)
Jerry Remy (fill-in game analyst)
Bill Ripken (fill-in game analyst)
F. P. Santangelo (fill-in game analyst)
Bill Schroeder (fill-in commentator)
Tom Verducci (fill-in game analyst)
Bob Walk (fill-in game analyst)

Other broadcasters
Patrick O'Neal (playoff sideline reporter, 2004–2005) currently the pregame host for both the Los Angeles Angels  and Los Angeles Kings on Bally Sports West.

Additional notes
Until the 2000 World Series, Bob Brenly, who normally did West Coast games with Thom Brennaman, regularly joined Joe Buck and Tim McCarver in the booth for big events (All-Star Game, potential record-breaking games, one League Championship Series, and the World Series. However, he became the manager of the Arizona Diamondbacks, who won the World Series under Brenly just a year later. After Brenly was fired by the Diamondbacks in the 2004 season, he briefly returned to Fox until being hired by the Chicago Cubs as their color commentator.

In 2001, Jeanne Zelasko became the first woman in more than a decade to regularly host Major League Baseball games for a network. The network canceled the pre-game show (as a cost-cutting measure) following the 2008 season.

In 2020, play-by-play announcers and color commentators called the games from the Fox Network Center in Los Angeles, CA.

See also
List of current Major League Baseball broadcasters

References

External links
Searchable Network TV Broadcasts

FOX
Major League Baseball on FOX broadcasters